Emperor Jingzong of Liao (1 September 948 – 13 October 982), personal name Yelü Xian, courtesy name Xianning, was the fifth emperor of the Khitan-led Liao dynasty of China. He improved government efficiency and reduced corruption. He was known with going to war with the Northern Song dynasty. He died during a hunting trip and his wife later served as regent over his still 11-year-old son, the later Emperor Shengzong.

Life
Yelü Xian succeeded Emperor Muzong in 969 after the latter was murdered by his servants during a hunting trip. He had support from both the Khitan and Han ruling elites.

Yelü Xian, who would come to be known as Emperor Jingzong made several important contributions to the Liao dynasty. He employed ethnic Han officials in his government, appointing one as the Minister of Southern Affairs and as the Duke of Qin. This allowed the government to run more efficiently and sped up the transformation of Khitan society into a feudal society. He cracked down on corruption in the government, firing those who were bribed or was incompetent. Emperor Jingzong also accepted criticisms willingly. He stopped hunting frequently after an official made a connection between hunting and Emperor Muzong's death. Later, Emperor Jingzong began to prepare war against his southern neighbours.

His conflict with the Northern Song dynasty happened when the Song invaded the Northern Han dynasty. However, the Liao reinforcements were destroyed by a Song army, and the Song later destroyed Northern Han. The Song army followed up the victory with an attack on Beijing, the Liao dynasty's southern capital. However, the Liao army completely routed the Song army, with Emperor Taizong of Song fleeing the battlefield. Several battles followed, with a stalemate between the Liao and Song dynasties.

At one point, Emperor Jingzong's body became weak and he had many diseases, sometimes unable to stand up during court proceedings. This led his wife, Xiao Yanyan to manage the great national story.

On 13 October, 982, Emperor Jingzong died due to sickness while on a hunting trip and died later in camp. In his dying testament, he was succeeded by his son Emperor Shengzong (982–1031), but since Shengzong was only 11 years old, Xiao Yanyan served as regent.

Family
Consort and issue(s):
 Empress Ruizhi, of the Xiao clan (睿智皇后 蕭氏, 953 – 1009); personal name Yanyan (燕燕), Jingzong's second cousin
Princess of Qi (齊國公主, 969–1045), personal name Guanyinnü (觀音女), 1st daughter
Married Xiao Jixian (蕭繼先) and had issue (1 son and 2 daughters)
Yelü Longxu, Emperor Shengzong (遼聖宗 耶律隆緒, 16 January 972 – 25 June 1031), 1st son
Yelü Longqing, Imperial Uncle Xiaozhen (孝貞皇太叔 耶律隆慶, 973–1016), 2nd son
Princess of Wei (975–1017) (衛國公主, 975–1017), personal name Changshounü (長壽女), 2nd daughter
Married Xiao Paiya (蕭排押) and had issue (2 daughters: Noble Consort Xiao and Princess Consort of Qin and Jin)
Princess of Yue (越國公主, 976 – 966), personal name Yanshounü (延壽女), 3rd daughter
Married Xiao Hengde (蕭恒德) and had issue (1 son , Xiao Pidi)
Yelü Longyou, Prince Xiaojing of Chu (楚孝靖王 耶律隆祐, 979–1012), 3rd son
Yelü Zhengge (耶律鄭哥) – disputed.
Consort, of Bohai (渤海妃)
Yelü Shuge (耶律淑哥), 4th daughter
Married Lu Jun (盧俊) in 980
Married Xiao Shennu (蕭神奴) in 983
 Lady Mou (某氏)
 Yelü Yaoshinu (耶律藥師奴), 4th son 
 Hunian (胡輦) – disputed, became the concubine of his son, Yelu Longxu; No issue.

Ancestry

In popular culture
Portrayed by Jing Chao in the 2020 Chinese TV series The Legend of Xiao Chuo.

References

Sources
 
 

948 births
982 deaths
Liao dynasty emperors
10th-century Chinese monarchs
10th-century rulers in Asia
People from Chifeng
10th-century Khitan rulers